Naylor Gardens is a small neighborhood located in southeast Washington, D.C. It is bounded by Alabama Avenue SE, 30th Street SE, Erie Street SE, 32nd Street SE, Gainesville Street SE, 31st Street SE, and Naylor Road SE. The neighborhood is located in the area south and east of the Anacostia River.

Naylor Gardens was founded in 1943, when the Defense Homes Corporation, a federal agency of the United States government which constructed housing for defense workers during World War II, constructed the $6 million, 750-unit Naylor Gardens apartment complex. The complex opened on February 1, 1943. Naylor Gardens is dominated by a housing cooperative. Hailed by The Washington Post as one of D.C.'s last best kept secrets, the neighborhood is minutes away from Capitol Hill and the Anacostia and Potomac riverfronts, and a short walk to the Southeast waterfront. The community is adjacent to Hillcrest to the northeast, Skyland to the northwest, and Garfield Heights to the west.

References

Bibliography

External links
Naylor Dupont A blog about Naylor Gardens and its neighbors

Neighborhoods in Southeast (Washington, D.C.)
1943 establishments in Washington, D.C.